Shaquil Delos (born 16 June 1999) is a French professional footballer who plays as a full-back for Estoril, on loan from  club Nancy.

Career
On 5 May 2019, Delos signed his first professional contract with Chambly. He made his professional debut with Chambly in a 3–0 Ligue 2 loss to Lens on 3 December 2019.

References

External links
 
 
 
 UNFP Profile

1999 births
Living people
People from Les Lilas
Black French sportspeople
French footballers
Association football fullbacks
FC Chambly Oise players
AS Nancy Lorraine players
Ligue 2 players
Championnat National players
Championnat National 2 players
Championnat National 3 players
G.D. Estoril Praia players
Primeira Liga players
French expatriate footballers
Expatriate footballers in Portugal
French expatriate sportspeople in Portugal